List of the largest parachute assaults happened post World War II.

 Tangail Airdrop : Over 5000 Paratroopers of Indian Army Paradropped to capture Poongli Bridge in East Pakistan( Present day Bangladesh) during the Indo-Pakistani War of 1971 aka Bangladesh Liberation War

List of the largest parachute assaults in history. The overwhelming majority of these occurred during World War II.

 Invasion of Normandy 13,100 American paratroopers and 8,500 British and Canadian paratroopers
 Operation Varsity March 24, 1945. 16,000 paratroopers
 Operation Market Garden September 17–25, 1944. 34,600 paratroopers. 
 Battle of Crete May 20 - June 1, 1941. 15,000 paratroopers

See also
 American airborne landings in Normandy
 Operation Tonga
 British airborne operations in North Africa
 List of amphibious assault operations

parachute
Airborne operations